Mumbai Internet Exchange (Mumbai IX) is a Mumbai-based Internet exchange point (IXP) founded on 15 August 2014 as Mumbai Convergence Hub (Mumbai CH) is an Open Carrier Neutral Internet Exchange & Peering Hub.  it interconnects more than 375 members, making it the largest IXP in India and surrounding region.

It's a subsidiary of Germany-based DE-CIX and is rebranded as DE-CIX Mumbai, not be confused with National Internet Exchange of India.

Organisation
Mumbai Internet Exchange is composed of a non-profit association model focus on improving Internet experience of Indian users. It is currently run by DE-CIX and are currently serving 375+ members spread across all over India.

Network
, Mumbai Internet Exchange network has 8 PoP in Mumbai Urban.

 Web Werks Mum DC2, Rabale, Navi Mumbai.
 Netmagic DC 5,Chandivali, Mumbai.
 STT Telemedia DC( Tata LVSB ) Prabhadevi, Mumbai.
 GPX IDC, Chandivali, Mumbai
Sify Rabale, Navi Mumbai
Netmagic DC 6, Mumbai
Netmagic DC 7, Mumbai
GPX Mumbai 2, Mumbai

Other Locations
DE-CIX Mumbai formerly known as Mumbai IX now holding national license has expanded its facilities to new cities in 2019,  all data center and carrier neutral and allow the settlement free exchange of traffic. The new locations are:
 DE-CIX Delhi (ST Telemedia Banglasahib (Tata VSB))
 DE-CIX Chennai (Bharti Airtel Santhome)
 DE-CIX Kolkata (ST Telemedia Kolkata (Tata Communications))

Ports of connection
Services are available through following types of port and several bandwidth options.

Services
Mumbai Internet Exchange offers the following professional services:

 Public peering: Unicast & multicast IPv4, unicast IPv6
 Private peering (Closed user group)
 Routes servers (with the communities feature)
 Web Portal: private login per member, personal detailed traffic statistics.
 24/7 NOC

Community
Mumbai Internet Exchange community comes from all around the world. Any organisation which owns an Autonomous System Number (also known as ASN) can be connected to Mumbai IX. The connected members of the Internet exchange point have various profiles:

 Social media
 Ecommerce
 ISP / Internet Access Providers / Telcos
 CDN Provider (Content Delivery Network)
 Hosting companies
 Cloud providers
 IPTV Networks
 Corporations
 DNS Root Server
 Email and Hosting

Awards and recognition
Mumbai Internet Exchange was Recognized as a Top Digital Innovator at 2016 Digital India Summit in the Digital Start-up Innovators category.

Mumbai Internet Exchange was Recognized as a Top Digital Innovator at the 2017 Digital India Summit in the Digital Start-up Innovators category for the second year in a row.

In September 2017 Mumbai IX received the prestigious Open-IX Certification from the Open-IX Association, making the Mumbai IX Asia's only IXP with Open-IX certification for its state-of-the-art technical standards.

See also
 List of Internet exchange points
National Internet Exchange of India
 List of Internet exchange points by size

References

External links



Internet exchange points in Asia
Telecommunications in India
Internet in India
2014 establishments in India